The black saw-wing (Psalidoprocne pristoptera), also known as the blue saw-wing or black rough-winged swallow, is a small passerine bird in the swallow family.

Distribution and habitat
The black rough-winged swallow breeds in open wooded habitats, and has a preference for wetter areas, although some races occur in mountain grassland habitat. It breeds across Africa from eastern Nigeria and Ethiopia south to Angola, northern Zimbabwe and northern Mozambique. The subspecies P. p. holomelaena breeds down south-eastern Africa from southern Mozambique to the Cape in South Africa.

This species is mainly resident, apart from seasonal local or altitudinal movements, but P. p. holomelaena is migratory, spending the southern winter north of the breeding range. The nominate race P. p. pristoptera of the mountains of northern Ethiopia moves south after breeding.

Description
The black rough-winged swallow is a small swallow at 13–15 cm length with a forked tail. Its plumage is blue-glossed black. Sexes are similar, but the female has shorter outer tail feathers, and less obvious wing serrations. Juveniles are brown with little gloss, and have short tails.

There are many subspecies of this swallow, which some authorities may split into different species. In particular, four northeastern races, including nominate P. p. pristoptera, have conspicuous white underwing coverts (all other subspecies are green-glossed and have completely dark underwings), and may be split as the  eastern rough-winged swallow or eastern saw-wing (swallow), P. orientalis.  This leaves P. p. holomelaena as the black rough-winged swallow, P. holomelaena. Other subspecies are also sometimes elevated to species status, but Turner and Rose take the view that all the races of the black rough-winged swallow are, at best, incipient species.

Subspecies
Shari saw-wing Psalidoprocne (pristoptera) chalybdea
Petit's saw-wing Psalidoprocne (pristoptera) petiti
Mangbettu saw-wing Psalidoprocne (pristoptera) mangbettorum
Ethiopian saw-wing Psalidoprocne (pristoptera) oleaginea
Blue saw-wing Psalidoprocne (pristoptera) pristoptera
Brown saw-wing Psalidoprocne (pristoptera) antinorii
Blanford's saw-wing Psalidoprocne (pristoptera) blanfordi
Eastern saw-wing Psalidoprocne (pristoptera) orientalis
Includes the race reichenowi
Black saw-wing Psalidoprocne (pristoptera) holomelas
Includes races massaica and ruwenzori

Behaviour
Black rough-winged swallows are usually seen in pairs or small groups hunting for flying insects in woodland clearings and edges, above forest, or over water. Their flight is weak and fluttering. It is a quiet species, but it gives a soft  alarm call.

Breeding
The nest is constructed from grass, moss or similar materials, and built in a 30–60 cm long burrow in a vertical sand or clay bank. This is usually an old burrow of another species like a kingfisher, but may be excavated by the breeding pair. The clutch is two, sometimes three, white eggs. Only one parent, probably the female, incubates for 14–19 days to hatching, with a further 24–27 days until the young fledge.

References

 Sinclair, Hockey and Tarboton, SASOL Birds of Southern Africa, 
 Turner and Rose, Swallows and Martins

External links
 (Black saw-wing = ) Black saw-winged swallow Psalidoprocne holomelaena - Species text in The Atlas of Southern African Birds.
 (Black saw-wing = ) Eastern saw-winged swallow Psalidoprocne orientalis - Species text in The Atlas of Southern African Birds.

black saw-wing
Birds of Sub-Saharan Africa
black saw-wing